Gʻallaorol is a city in Jizzakh Region, Uzbekistan. It is the administrative center of Gʻallaorol District. The town population was 16,623 people in 1989, and 24,700 in 2016. Situated on the Tashkent–Samarkand railway, it became a city in 1973.

References

Populated places in Jizzakh Region
Cities in Uzbekistan